Large Standing Woman I is a bronze sculpture created by Alberto Giacometti in 1960.

The outdoor sculpture is installed in the Lillie and Hugh Roy Cullen Sculpture Garden of the Museum of Fine Arts, Houston, located in Houston, Texas.

See also

 1960 in art
 List of public art in Houston

References

1960 sculptures
Bronze sculptures in Texas
Lillie and Hugh Roy Cullen Sculpture Garden
Sculptures by Alberto Giacometti
Sculptures of women in Texas